Robert Schuman Medal named after Robert Schuman is awarded to several people annually by the European People's Party group in the European Parliament since July 1986 "to pay tribute to public figures who have advanced the cause of peace, the construction of Europe and human values through their public activities and personal commitment."

Lauretes

References

Notes

Human rights awards
European awards
Awards established in 1986